Jacob Wolfowitz (March 19, 1910 – July 16, 1981) was a Polish-born American Jewish statistician and Shannon Award-winning information theorist.  He was the father of former United States Deputy Secretary of Defense and World Bank Group President Paul Wolfowitz.

Life and career
Wolfowitz was born in 1910 in Warsaw, Poland, the son of Helen (Pearlman) and Samuel Wolfowitz. He emigrated with his parents to the United States in 1920. In the mid-1930s, Wolfowitz began his career as a high school mathematics teacher and continued teaching until 1942 when he received his Ph.D. degree in mathematics from New York University. While a part-time graduate student, Wolfowitz met Abraham Wald, with whom he collaborated in numerous joint papers in the field of mathematical statistics. This collaboration continued until Wald's death in an airplane crash in 1950. In 1951, Wolfowitz became a professor of mathematics at Cornell University, where he stayed until 1970. From 1970 to 1978 he was at the University of Illinois at Urbana–Champaign. He died of a heart attack in Tampa, Florida, where he had become a professor at the University of South Florida after retiring from Illinois.

Wolfowitz's main contributions were in the fields of statistical decision theory, non-parametric statistics, sequential analysis, and information theory.

One of his results is the strong converse to Claude Shannon's coding theorem. While Shannon could prove only that the block error probability can not become arbitrarily small if the transmission rate is above the channel capacity, Wolfowitz proved that the block error rate actually converges to one. As a consequence, Shannon's original result is today termed "the weak theorem" (sometimes also Shannon's "conjecture" by some authors).

Further reading
 Kiefer, J., ed. Jacob Wolfowitz Selected Papers. New York: Springer-Verlag, 1980. .
 Wolfowitz, Jacob, Coding Theorems of Information Theory. New York: Springer-Verlag, 1978. .

References

External links
 .
 
Zacks, Shelemyahu. "Biographical Memories: Jacob Wolfowitz (March 19, 1910–July 16, 1981)". National Academy of Sciences, n.d. Accessed May 3, 2007.

1910 births
1981 deaths
American statisticians
20th-century American mathematicians
Courant Institute of Mathematical Sciences alumni
Cornell University faculty
University of South Florida faculty
American people of Polish-Jewish descent
American Ashkenazi Jews
Polish Ashkenazi Jews
Jewish American scientists
Jewish scientists
Presidents of the Institute of Mathematical Statistics
Fellows of the American Statistical Association
Polish emigrants to the United States
Probability theorists
Fellows of the Econometric Society
20th-century American Jews
Mathematical statisticians
University of Illinois Urbana-Champaign faculty
Columbia University faculty
City University of New York alumni
New York University alumni
People from Warsaw